The white-throated gerygone (Gerygone olivacea) is a species of bird in the family Acanthizidae.
It is found in Australia and Papua New Guinea.
Its natural habitats are temperate forests and subtropical or tropical moist lowland forests. Its common names include white-throated warbler, white-throated flyeater, bush canary, and native canary.

Gallery

References

white-throated gerygone
Birds of Australia
Birds of Papua New Guinea
white-throated gerygone
Taxonomy articles created by Polbot